Windsor Township is one of twenty townships in Fayette County, Iowa, USA.  As of the 2010 census, its population was 776.

Geography
According to the United States Census Bureau, Windsor Township covers an area of 36.26 square miles (93.92 square kilometers).

Cities, towns, villages
 Hawkeye

Adjacent townships
 Auburn Township (north)
 Dover Township (northeast)
 Union Township (east)
 Westfield Township (southeast)
 Center Township (south)
 Banks Township (southwest)
 Bethel Township (west)
 Eden Township (northwest)

Cemeteries
The township contains five cemeteries: Boale, Hawkeye, South Windsor and Windsor, Righale.

Major highways
  U.S. Route 18

Landmarks
 Hauth Park

School districts
 North Fayette Valley Community School District

Political districts
 Iowa's 1st congressional district
 State House District 18
 State Senate District 9

References
 United States Census Bureau 2008 TIGER/Line Shapefiles
 United States Board on Geographic Names (GNIS)
 United States National Atlas

External links
 US-Counties.com
 City-Data.com

Townships in Fayette County, Iowa
Townships in Iowa